Hajji Tarkhan or Hajji Tarkhan al Jedid, also known as Hashtar Khan /  Astarxan or Astrakhan, was a medieval city at the right bank of Volga, situated approximately 12 km north of the modern city of Astrakhan. The first mention of the town was recorded in 1333. In the 13th and 14th centuries, it was one of the main trade and political centres of the Golden Horde. In 1395, the city was sacked by Timur. Astrakhan was rebuilt afterwards and became the capital of the Khanate of Astrakhan in 1459. In 1547, the city was seized by the Crimean khan Sahib I Giray. In 1556, Astrakhan was besieged and burned  by Ivan the Terrible.

See also
Saqsin
Atil Astrakhan was fought over in 1917-1922 and bombed in 1942.

Footnotes

References

Destroyed cities
Golden Horde
Astrakhan Khanate
Defunct towns in Russia
Populated places on the Volga
Former populated places in Russia